Marie Skammelsen (born February 22, 2001) is a retired Danish artistic gymnast.  A Danish national team member since 2010, joining at an unprecedented age of nine, she has amassed several medals at the Northern European Gymnastics Championships as a junior, including her all-around title at the 2016 event. In June 2016, she made a fourth place finish in the vault final at the 2016 European Artistic Gymnastics Championships in Bern, Switzerland.

As of October 2017, she now longer practises gymnastics.

Career

2014–16: Junior career

2014 
In September, Skammelsen competed at the 2014 Northern European Gymnastics Championships, which were held in Greve, Denmark. With her team, she took a silver medal, and an eleventh place finish in the all-around standings. She advanced to the vault event final and finished in second place position.

2015 
Skammelsen participated in the 2015 European Youth Summer Olympic Festival in the summer of 2015, where she travelled to Tbilisi, Georgia. In the qualification round, she finished thirty-sixth which didn't advance her through to the all-around final; she did make the vault final though. In the vault final, she finished fifth.

Later in the year, in mid-September, Skammelsen participated in the 2015 Northern European Gymnastics Championships in Limerick, Ireland. She took an eighth place finish in the all-around standings, in addition to three event finals. In the event finals, Skammelsen took home two bronze medals; one on vault and one on balance beam, as well as a fourth place finish on floor.

2016 
Skammelsen became the Danish Junior Champion in the all-around in April. She claimed additional titles on the vault and floor too.

In May, she travelled to Reykjavik, Iceland for the 2016 Nordic Championships. At the championships, she was crowned the junior Nordic all-around champion. She also captured Junior Nordic titles on vault and floor, in addition to medals on the remaining two events.

A month later, in June, she journeyed to Bern for the 2016 European Artistic Gymnastics Championships. The qualification round saw Skammelsen advance to the all-around final in one of the final qualification spots. She also qualified to the vault event final, taking the seventh place in the quota. In the all-around final, Skammelsen finished twentieth in the field of twenty-four. Soon after, she participated in the vault final where she over-performed to a finish of fourth place.

2020–present: Senior career 
Skammelsen becomes a senior gymnast in 2017, and has openly set her immediate sights on participating at the 2017 Artistic Gymnastics World Championships in Montreal, Quebec, Canada. Her more long-term goal is to make the 2020 Summer Olympics in Tokyo, Japan – a participation from Skammelsen in these games would be the first of any Danish gymnast since 1976.

References

External links
  
 

2001 births
Living people
Danish female artistic gymnasts
People from Rudersdal Municipality
Sportspeople from the Capital Region of Denmark